Llewelyn Wyn Griffith CBE (30 August 1890 – 27 September 1977) was a Welsh novelist, born in Llandrillo yn Rhos, Clwyd. A captain in the 15th Royal Welch Fusiliers, part of the 38th (Welsh) Division during the First World War, he is known for his memoir, Up to Mametz, which he wrote in the early 1920s, although the work was not published until 1931.

Griffith was a career civil servant, and rose to a senior post in the Inland Revenue. He was a key helper to Sir Ernest Gowers in the writing of Plain Words in 1948. He was a well-known broadcaster, a founder-member of the Round Britain Quiz team. After retirement from the Inland Revenue he served as vice chairman of the Arts Council of Great Britain. He was appointed CBE in the 1961 Birthday Honours.

A continuation of his World War memoir, based on research into Griffith's papers, was published in 2010.

Works

Works by Griffith
Up to Mametz (1930)
Spring of Youth (1935) 
The Wooden Spoon (1937) 
The Way Lies West (1945) 
The Barren Tree (1945) 
The Welsh (1950) 
The Adventures of Pryderi (1962)

Related works
Up to Mametz and Beyond (2010)

Notes

1890 births
1977 deaths
Anglo-Welsh novelists
British Army personnel of World War I
Commanders of the Order of the British Empire
Royal Welch Fusiliers officers
20th-century Welsh novelists
Welsh male novelists
20th-century British male writers
People from Conwy